Jock Henderson may refer to:

Jock Henderson (footballer, born 1871) (1871–1930), Scottish footballer for Celtic, Lincoln City, Leicester Fosse and Small Heath
Jock Henderson (footballer, born 1895) (1895–1957), Scottish footballer for Manchester City, Southend United, Gillingham and Dunfermline Athletic

See also 
John Henderson (disambiguation)